Live at Cornerstone 2000 may refer to:

Live at Cornerstone 2000: Plugged (The Choir album)
Live at Cornerstone 2000: Unplugged (The Choir album)
Live at Cornerstone 2000 (One Bad Pig album)